It is estimated that there are over 20,000 Chinese people in Chile. Chinese immigrants come from both China and Taiwan.

Reasons for immigration
A high demand for manpower in the Southern South American region was present around the 1950s–1960s because of capitalism in the region. This demand for manpower also drew in a huge number of Chinese people coming to South America for work, which explains the huge increase of Chinese people 1950s–1960s. This immigration was also present in the War of the Pacific with Chinese immigrating to both Peru and Chile to enlist into the war effort. After the war came to a close with a Chilean victor, people from Peru also settled in Chile. This was supportive due to the damages of the war done and they could work for construction of the infrastructure or just working inside factories.

Migration history
Between 1,200 and 1,500 Chinese workers in Peru offered support to the Chilean side in the War of the Pacific (1879–1883) and thus went to Chile at the war's end. 

Today the Chinese people living in Chile work primarily in trade and restaurant jobs. Although in Santiago one can find many local Chinese businesses, including importers, supermarkets, mini markets, malls (shopping centers such as Santiago Centro and Estación Central), Chinatowns are not concentrated in one place, except in the neighborhood of Patronato, where most of the Asian (i.e. mostly Chinese, Korean and Taiwanese) immigrants, niche businesses and supermarkets in Santiago are located.

Notable people
 Jaime Carreño Lee Chong, footballer
 Rung Fang Cheng, dancer and participant Rojo
 Chinoy, singer songwriter, visual artist
 Jorge Chiong, works director of the commune of Lampa
 Ximena Chong, fiscal
 Guillermo Chong, geologist
 Óscar Lee Chong, former footballer
 Diego Lin Chou, writer
 Luis Cruz-Villalobos, poet, psychologist
 Quintin Quintana, leader of the Coolies
 Viviana Shieh, singer
 Yuc Ramón Kong, medical field
 Quintín Quintana, personality of the War of the Pacific

See also

 Chinatowns in Latin America - about the Chinese community of Santiago

References

Sources
 

Asian Chilean
Ethnic groups in Chile
Chilean
Chinese diaspora in South America
Chile–China relations
Chinese Latin American